Xuluf is a village in the municipality of Keçili in the Shamkir Rayon of Azerbaijan.

References

Populated places in Shamkir District